Change Healthcare (known as Emdeon before rebranding in 2015, which followed the acquisition Change Healthcare) is a provider of revenue and payment cycle management that connects payers, providers, and patients within the U.S. healthcare system. The name also refers to a company founded in 2007 which subsequently became part of the current conglomerate. The company operates the largest financial and administrative information exchange in the United States.

The company is headquartered in Nashville, Tennessee, with more than 89 additional locations throughout the United States, Canada, New Zealand, Israel, Taiwan, the UK, and the Philippines.

History

Change Healthcare (2007)
A company called Change Healthcare was established in 2007 and based in Brentwood, Tennessee. The company provided healthcare consumer engagement and cost transparency tools to health plans and large, self-insured employers across the United States. The company was founded by Christopher Parks and Robert Hendrick in 2007 with a consumer solution called MedBillManager. In January 2010, the company shifted its focus to the business-to-business market and launched the Change Healthcare Engagement Platform.

In April 2011, Howard McLure, former president of CVS Caremark, came out of retirement to lead Change Healthcare as chairman and CEO. Doug Ghertner joined the company as president in July 2011; prior to this, he oversaw product innovation and management at CVS Caremark and was a senior vice president.

In December 2011, Change Healthcare closed a round of financing, led by Sandbox Industries, BlueCross BlueShield Venture Partners and West Health Investment Fund. In September 2012, Ghertner was promoted to president and CEO, and McLure assumed the role of executive chairman.

In July 2013, Change Healthcare closed on a round of Series D funding. It was led by HLM Venture Partners, and including new investor Noro-Moseley Partners, infused $15 million into the company. In July 2013, Change Healthcare was also named one of Modern Healthcare’s “100 Best Places to Work in Healthcare."

Emdeon 
In 2004, WebMD Corporation acquired Dakota Imaging, Inc. and ViPS, Inc.

Until August 2005, Emdeon operated under the name WebMD Corporation (NASDAQ: HLTH). The name was changed to Emdeon to avoid confusion with its then subsidiary WebMD, which started public trading under stock symbol WBMD in September 2005.

In May 2009, the company acquired The Sentinel Group, a vendor of software and investigational services to combat health care fraud. In January 2010, the company acquired FutureVision Investment Group, L.L.C. (FVTech), a provider of outsourced services specializing in electronic data conversion and information management solutions. In March 2010, the company acquired Healthcare Technology Management Services, Inc. (HTMS), a management consulting company focused primarily on the healthcare payer market. In June 2010, the company acquired Chapin Revenue Cycle Management, LLC (Chapin), a technology-enabled provider of accounts receivable denial and recovery services. In August 2010, the company acquired Interactive Payer Network (IPN), a leading technology service provider that acts as an outsourcing partner for HIPAA-compliant healthcare electronic data interchange (EDI). In October 2010, the company acquired Chamberlin Edmonds & Associates, Inc. (CEA), a technology-enabled provider of government program eligibility and enrollment services. In May 2011, the company acquired EquiClaim, a provider of healthcare audit and recovery services for commercial and government payers, from MultiPlan, Inc.

In August 2011, Emdeon Inc. was taken private for $3 Billion by Blackstone Group. Blackstone's offer of $19 per Emdeon share was backed by committed financing from Bank of America Merrill Lynch, Barclays Capital and Citigroup. Emdeon shares jumped 13.6% the morning after the acquisition. Shares had risen 31% over the previous year until the announcement.

In May 2012, the company acquired TC3 Health, a cost containment provider, including payment integrity and out-of-network claims cost management, to U.S. healthcare payers. In June 2013, the company acquired Goold Health Systems, a healthcare management organization that specializes in providing pharmacy benefit and related services primarily to State Medicaid agencies across the nation. In July 2014, the company acquired Capario, a provider of healthcare technology solutions using a cloud-based platform that enables healthcare providers to use a real-time solution called CaparioOneSM.

In November 2014, Change Healthcare was acquired by Emdeon for $135 million. In November 2015 Emdeon officially rebranded to take the Change Healthcare name.

In December 2014, the company acquired AdminiSource Communications, Inc., a payment and communications solutions (PCS) business of Alegeus Technologies, LLC, a provider of consumer directed healthcare services. In August 2015, the company acquired Altegra Health, a provider of technology and intervention platforms that combine data aggregation and analytics with member engagement and reporting capabilities.

In June 2016, McKesson Corporation and Change Healthcare Holdings, Inc., announced the creation of a new healthcare company which combined substantially all of Change Healthcare's business with the majority of McKesson's Information technology unit. McKesson owns approximately 70% of the new company, with the remaining equity stake held by Change Healthcare stockholders. The new company continues to be called Change Healthcare.

In October 2018, it was reported that Change Healthcare Corporation hired underwriters and investment banks for a 2018/2019 time-frame initial public offering. On June 27, 2019, Change Healthcare Inc, with stock symbol CHNG, started trading on the NASDAQ stock exchange and offered as many as 49.2 million shares of its stock, at a price of $13 per share raising more than $640 million in its IPO.

In December 2018, Change Healthcare acquired the intellectual property and other key assets, including employees, of Charleston-based health care IT startup PokitDok.

In January 2021, UnitedHealth Group's OptumInsight unit agreed to acquire Change Healthcare in a deal valued at $13billion, including assuming $5billion of latter's debt. Following delays due to regulator scrutiny, the acquisition closed on October 3, 2022.

Market segments 
 Physicians & Clinics
 Hospitals & Health Systems
 Payers
 Pharmacies
 Channel Partners
 Dentists
 Clinical Exchange
 Labs
 Government Services

As of October 2015, the company's health information network reached approximately 1,200 government and commercial payers, 700,000 providers, 5,000 hospitals, 105,000 dentists, 60,000 pharmacies, 600 vendor partners, and 150 labs.

In 2014, Emdeon processed over 8.1 billion transactions, and handles over $6.4 billion in transactions each year.

Key personnel
, the Management team included:
 Neil de Crescenzo IV, Chief Executive Officer
 Alex Choy, Chief Information Officer
 Fredrik J. Eliasson, Chief Financial Officer

References

External links

Companies formerly listed on the Nasdaq
Health care companies based in Tennessee
Companies based in Nashville, Tennessee
2007 establishments in Tennessee
American companies established in 2007
Health care companies established in 2005
Health care companies established in 2007
2019 initial public offerings
2022 mergers and acquisitions